Nazeli "Nazik" Avdalyan (born October 31, 1986 in Gyumri, Armenia) is an Armenian weightlifter.

Biography
Avdalyan won a gold medal at the 2009 World Weightlifting Championships. Avdalyan is the first ever weightlifter from the independent Republic of Armenia to win a gold medal at the World Weightlifting Championships and the first ever woman from Armenia to win a world championship in any sport.

Armenian Sport Journalists Federation conducted an annual survey among 52 Armenian sport journalists who voted Nazik Avdalyan the best Armenian sportswoman of 2009. Avdalyan won by a record 520 points.

On April 26, 2010, Avdalyan got in a car crash on Yerevan-Gyumri motorway and was taken to Gyumri hospital. She had received multiple bone fractures and a spine injury. Advalyan was transferred to Yerevan's Erebuni medical centre for additional examination and underwent lumbar surgery on April 28. After the rehabilitation process, Avdalyan said she will be able to compete in sports again in 2013. After seven years of absence Avdalyan made a huge comeback and won a gold medal at the 2016 European Weightlifting Championships.

Personal life 
Nazik Avdalyan was married to former weightlifter Erik Karapetyan on June 9, 2012 in Yerevan, Armenia. The couple had been engaged for a long time but the wedding was delayed because of Avdalyan's car accident. In November, Avdalyan gave birth to a boy, Vache՛.

References 

1986 births
Living people
Sportspeople from Gyumri
Armenian female weightlifters
European champions in weightlifting
European champions for Armenia
Weightlifters at the 2016 Summer Olympics
Olympic weightlifters of Armenia
European Weightlifting Championships medalists
World Weightlifting Championships medalists
21st-century Armenian women